Michaël Llodra and Nenad Zimonjić were the defending champions but decided not to participate together.
Llodra was scheduled to play with Jérémy Chardy, but the pair withdrew before their first round match, while Zimonjić played alongside Daniel Nestor and successfully defended the title, defeating Treat Conrad Huey and Dominic Inglot 7–5, 6–7(4–7), [10–5] in the final.

Seeds

Draw

Draw

References
 Main Draw

Swiss Indoors - Doubles
2012 Davidoff Swiss Indoors